Churchill Bust may refer to:

 Bust of Winston Churchill (Epstein), a sculpture by Jacob Epstein commissioned in 1945
 Bust of Winston Churchill, Mishkenot Sha'ananim, a 2002 sculpture by Oscar Nemon

See also 
 Statue of Winston Churchill, Parliament Square
 Statue of Winston Churchill, Palace of Westminster
 Winston Churchill (disambiguation)